Nathan B. "Nate" Bruckenthal (July 17, 1979April 24, 2004) was a United States Coast Guardsman who was killed in the Iraq War, becoming the first to die in wartime action since the Vietnam War. Bruckenthal and two U.S. Navy sailors were killed while intercepting a waterborne suicide attack on an offshore oil terminal off the coast of Iraq in the northern Persian Gulf in 2004.

Bruckenthal was posthumously awarded the Bronze Star Medal with Combat Distinguishing Device and the Purple Heart for his actions.

Early life and education
Bruckenthal was born in Stony Brook, New York, the son of Ric Bruckenthal of Northport, New York, and Laurie Bullock of Ashburn, Virginia. While growing up he had also lived in Hawaii, Virginia, and Connecticut. Bruckenthal and his family lived in Ridgefield, Connecticut from 1992 to 1995, where he was a volunteer firefighter from 1997 to 1998. Bruckenthal was a graduate of Ridgefield High School and intended to follow his service in the U.S. Coast Guard by subsequently going to college and becoming a policeman or a fireman.

Career

United States Coast Guard

Bruckenthal joined the U.S. Coast Guard on January 5, 1999. After his schooling, he was assigned to Station Neah Bay in the northwest corner of Washington on the Makah Indian Reservation.

His next assignment was to Tactical Law Enforcement (TACLET) Team South, at Coast Guard Air Station Miami. Bruckenthal's first tour to the Persian Gulf region was from April to June 2003. He departed home for his second deployment in February 2004 and was due to return that June.

On his first deployment to the Persian Gulf region, Bruckenthal was awarded the Armed Forces Expeditionary Medal and the Combat Action Ribbon.

Attack in the Persian Gulf

On April 24, 2004, Bruckenthal and two U.S. Navy sailors were killed while intercepting a waterborne suicide attack on the Khawr Al Amaya Oil Terminal off the coast of Iraq in the northern Persian Gulf.

An account of the attack was included the May 2004 issue of U.S. Coast Guard Reservist magazine:

Abu-Musab al-Zarqawi of al-Qaeda in Iraq claimed responsibility for the attack.

Bruckenthal was posthumously awarded the Bronze Star Medal with Combat Distinguishing Device and the Purple Heart, and the Global War on Terrorism Expeditionary Medal. He is buried at Arlington National Cemetery.

Awards and decorations

Personal life
In 2001, Bruckenthal met his future wife, Pattie, while serving at U.S. Coast Guard Station Neah Bay. Pattie was a university student studying the Makah Indian tribe when Bruckenthal gave the students a tour of the station. Bruckenthal is survived by his wife, Pattie, and his daughter, Harper Natalie Bruckenthal, who was born after his death.

Legacy
He is the first U.S. Coast Guardsman to be killed in action in military conflict since the Vietnam War. Bruckenthal's death is noted in an article listing Jewish U.S. service members killed in Iraq.

The Unaccompanied Personnel Housing building at Coast Guard Station Montauk  and Training Center Cape May, is named in honor of Bruckenthal. He served as a fireman on the USCGC Point Wells, which was homeported in Montauk, New York.

On April 24, 2014, the Commandant of the Coast Guard, Admiral Robert Papp, announced that the 28th Sentinel-class cutter would be named after Bruckenthal.

Notes
Citations

References cited

External links

 Nathan B. Bruckenthal at TogetherWeServed

 

1979 births
2004 deaths
Jewish American military personnel
American military personnel killed in the Iraq War
Burials at Arlington National Cemetery
United States Coast Guard non-commissioned officers
People from Stony Brook, New York
People from Montauk, New York